This is a list of films that were adapted into novels.

Action films
 Baahubali 2: The Conclusion
 Bond films: Moonraker, The Spy Who Loved Me
 Indiana Jones (franchise): all the

Comedy films
 Bloodbath at the House of Death (comedy horror)
 Clueless
 Condorman (comedy superhero)
 Galaxy Quest (science fiction parody)
 Ghost Dad (fantasy comedy)
 Ghostbusters and Ghostbusters II (fantasy comedy)
 Help!
 Home Alone and Home Alone 3
 Howard the Duck (comedy science fiction)
 Struck by Lightning (2012)

Drama films
 Appa (2016)
 Aval Appadithan
 Fireworks (2017)
 Kanku
 Savitri (1993)

Epic films
 The Fall of the Roman Empire
 Mayabazar
 Sri Rama Rajyam

Fantasy films
 The Boy and the Beast
 Constantine
 Ghost Dad (fantasy comedy)
 Ghostbusters and Ghostbusters II (fantasy comedy)
 Highlander
 King Kong (1933)
 Mirai
 My Neighbor Totoro
 Snow White and the Seven Dwarfs (1937)

Horror films
 Bloodbath at the House of Death (comedy horror)
 The Curse of Frankenstein
 Friday the 13th (franchise)
 Fright Night
 Hellraiser (franchise)
 The Hills Have Eyes
 The Thing (1982)

Science fiction films
 2001: A Space Odyssey
 Alien (franchise)
 The Black Hole
 Galaxy Quest (science fiction parody)
 Howard the Duck (comedy science fiction)
 Predator (franchise)
 RoboCop 2
 Star Trek films: Star Trek: The Motion Picture, Star Trek II: The Wrath of Khan, Star Trek III: The Search for Spock, Star Trek IV: The Voyage Home, Star Trek V: The Final Frontier, Star Trek Generations, Star Trek: First Contact, Star Trek: Insurrection, Star Trek (2009)
 Star Wars: all the 
 Summer Wars
 Terminator (franchise)
 Titan A.E.
 Voyage to the Bottom of the Sea

Superhero films
 Batman films: Batman (1989), Batman & Robin, Batman Forever,  Batman Returns
 Condorman (comedy superhero)
 The Shadow (1994)
 Superman Returns

Others
 Avatharam (1995)
 Kadhal Kottai
 The Legend of the Lone Ranger
 Malliswari (1951)

See also
:Category:Novels based on films

Novels
Films
Lists of films